Since 1956, Lithuania honors their greatest athlete of the year. Until 2014 The award's trophy, a bronze archer, has been given to the winners. Since 2014 the award ceremony was changed with new categories added.

Recipients

1956 - 2014

2014 - 2019

2021 onwards

References

External links 
 2008 Lithuanian Sportsman of the Year

National sportsperson-of-the-year trophies and awards

Lithuanian sports trophies and awards
Awards established in 1994
1956 establishments in Lithuania